Walking the Way: The Lost Spells of Rokugan is a 1998 role-playing game supplement for Legend of the Five Rings Roleplaying Game published by Alderac Entertainment Group.

Contents
Walking the Way: The Lost Spells of Rokugan is a supplement in which over fifty new spells are described.

Reception
Walking the Way was reviewed in the online second version of Pyramid which said "For those who wish that there were more spells for the shugenja of the Legend of the Five Rings setting, AEG has heard you."

Reviews
Backstab #15

References

Legend of the Five Rings Roleplaying Game
Role-playing game books
Role-playing game supplements introduced in 1998